The Canon de 75 modèle 1905 Schneider, factory designation Matériel de campagne à tir rapide de 75 mm, modèle 1903 PR (Puissant, système de récupération de recul à Ressort), Bulgarian designation "75-мм скорострелно полско оръдие “Шнайдер” образец 1904 год, was a field gun developed by Gustave Canet and used by Bulgaria during World War I and World War II. Some 324 had been delivered by the end of 1907 and most were still in service in 1939.

Notes

References 
 Chamberlain, Peter & Gander, Terry. Light and Medium Field Artillery. New York: Arco, 1975
 https://www.bulgarianartillery.it/Bulgarian%20Artillery%201/Schneider-Canet%2075mm%201904.htm
 http://www.passioncompassion1418.com/Canons/AfficheCanonGET.php?IdCanonAffiche=1159

World War II field artillery
World War I guns
75 mm artillery
Schneider Electric